The 2018–19 North Florida Ospreys men's basketball team represented the University of North Florida in the 2018–19 NCAA Division I men's basketball season. They played their home games at the UNF Arena in Jacksonville, Florida and were led by 10th-year head coach Matthew Driscoll.

Previous season
The Ospreys finished the 2017–18 season 14–19, 7–7 in ASUN play to finish in a tie for fourth place. In the ASUN tournament, they defeated NJIT, before losing in the semifinals to Florida Gulf Coast.

Roster

Schedule and results

|-
!colspan=12 style=| Non-conference regular season

|-
!colspan=9 style=| Atlantic Sun Conference regular season

|-
!colspan=12 style=| Atlantic Sun tournament
|-

|-

Source

References

North Florida Ospreys men's basketball seasons
North Florida Ospreys
2018 in sports in Florida